The 1990 Toledo Rockets football team represented the University of Toledo during the 1990 NCAA Division I-A football season. The Rockets were led by first-year head coach Nick Saban, and competed as a member of the Mid-American Conference (MAC). They finished the season with a record of nine wins and two losses (9–2, 7–1 in MAC play) and as MAC co–champions with Central Michigan.

The 1990 Rockets squad opened the season with six consecutive victories over Miami (OH), Northern Illinois, Ball State, Ohio, Eastern Michigan and Bowling Green. At the time of the matchup, their meeting against Central Michigan served as a de facto MAC conference championship game. Although Toledo lost 13–12, victories over Kent State and Western Michigan coupled with a Central Michigan loss to Ball State gave the Rockets a share of the MAC championship. Toledo then concluded the season with a loss to Navy and a victory over Arkansas State.

In February 1991, Nick Saban resigned as head coach of the Rockets after only one season to become defensive coordinator of the National Football League's Cleveland Browns.

Before the season

Toledo finished their 1989 season with a record of six wins and five losses (6–5, 6–2 in MAC play) and tied for second place in the final conference standings. Although the Rockets finished the season with a winning record, on November 22, 1989, head coach Dan Simrell was fired by Toledo athletic director Al Bohl. By mid-December, the finalists were narrowed to Pete Cordelli (then the quarterbacks coach at Notre Dame) and Nick Saban (then the secondary coach for the Houston Oilers). On December 22, 1989, Bohl announced that Saban had been hired to replace Simrell as head coach at Toledo. The position was Saban's first as a head coach.

Schedule

Game summaries

Miami

Source:

To open the 1990 season, Toledo traveled to Oxford to play the Miami Redskins. In what was both the head coaching debut for Saban and the Redskins' Randy Walker, the Rockets won 20–14. Toledo scored first on a one-yard Troy Parker run early in the first quarter for a 7–0 lead. However, Miami responded on the kickoff that followed when Milt Stegall returned it 92-yards for the score to tie the game at 7–7. Later in the first, Jeff Lamb recovered a Jim Clement fumble at the Redskins 12-yard line. Three plays later, Parker scored his second one-yard touchdown to give Toledo a 14–7 lead. Early in the second quarter, Dave Walkosky intercepted a Clement pass to give the Rockets possession at their 33-yard line. Nine plays later, Parker scored his third touchdown of the afternoon, this time from two-yards out. Rusty Hanna then had his extra point attempt blocked and Toledo led 20–7 at halftime.

In the third quarter, a snap went over the head of punter Brian Borders to give Miami possession at the Toledo 21-yard line. However, a goal line stand by the Rockets' defense kept the Redskins out of the endzone on a failed fourth-and-one running play. In the fourth quarter, Miami scored the final points of the game on a five-yard Terry Carter touchdown run to make the final score 20–14. The victory improved Toledo's all-time record against Miami to 16–22.

Northern Illinois

Source:

In their first home game of the 1990 season, Toledo defeated the Northern Illinois Huskies 23–14 in what was the first game played since the completion of an $18 million ($ in  dollars) renovation at the Glass Bowl. Toledo scored first on an eight-yard run by Troy Parker to take an early 7–0 lead. The Huskies responded with a 15-yard run by Stacey Robinson to tie the game at 7–7 at the end of the first quarter. In the second quarter, Rusty Hanna then retook the lead for Toledo with his 23-yard field goal before Northern Illinois responded with a 12-yard Robinson touchdown pass to Ray Patterson for a 14–10 halftime lead for the Huskies.

In the third quarter, the Rockets retook the lead after Kevin Meger scored on a 26-yard run, and after a failed extra point attempt Toledo led 16–14. Parker then scored the final points of the game in the fourth with his two-yard touchdown run for the 23–14 win. Parker set a new school record with his 40 running attempts and rushed for 205 yards on the afternoon. For his performance, Parker was named the Mid-American Conference Offensive Player of the Week. The victory improved Toledo's all-time record against Northern Illinois to 16–6.

Ball State

Source:

In week three, Toledo defeated the Ball State Cardinals 28–16 at Scheumann Stadium in Muncie. After a scoreless first quarter, Toledo took a 7–0 halftime lead after Kevin Meger scored on a two-yard run to complete a 75-yard drive. The Rockets then extended their lead to 14–0 early in the third quarter on a two-yard Troy Parker run before the Cardinals cut the lead to 14–3 on a 47-yard Kenny Stucker field goal late in the quarter.

In the fourth quarter, each team traded a pair of touchdowns with Toledo winning the game 28–16. Toledo scored on touchdown runs of two-yards by Parker and ten-yards by Meger. Ball State scored touchdowns on a 19-yard Corey Croom run and on a 22-yard Scott Hammersley pass to Travis Moore. The victory improved Toledo's all-time record against Ball State to 8–8.

Ohio

Source:

For the third time in as many road games the Rockets were victorious, and this time Toledo defeated the Ohio Bobcats 27–20 at Peden Stadium in Athens. After a scoreless first quarter, each team connected on a field goal before Troy Parker scored the first touchdown of the game on an 11-yard run for a 10–3 Toledo lead. Each team again traded field goals later in the quarter to make the halftime score 13–6.

In the third quarter, Parker scored on a nine-yard run for Toledo and Ohio responded with a one-yard touchdown run for a 20–13 Rockets lead at the start of the fourth quarter. In the fourth, the Bobcats tied the game up at 20–20 when Anthony Thornton threw a 29-yard touchdown pass to Courtney Burton. Toledo then scored the game-winning touchdown with only 0:17 remaining in the game when Parker scored on a one-yard run to complete a 68-yard, 15 play drive. The victory improved Toledo's all-time record against Ohio to 21–19–1.

Eastern Michigan

Source:

With Troy Parker seeing limited action due to an injury, Neil Trotter rushed for 145 yards and Corey Ivey for 96 as Toledo defeated the Eastern Michigan Hurons 37–23. The Rockets took a 10–0 lead in the first quarter on an eight-yard Ivey touchdown run and 37-yard Rusty Hanna field goal. In the second, both teams scored ten points to give Toledo a 20–10 halftime lead. The Hurons scored on an 85-yard Craig Thompson punt return and a 36-yard Jim Langeloh field goal; the Rockets scored on a 32-yard Hanna field goal and three-yard Kevin Meger touchdown run.

In the third, Eastern Michigan cut the lead to 20–17 after Cameron Moss scored on a 48-yard touchdown run. Toledo responded with 17 consecutive, fourth quarter points to win the game. After a 37-yard Hanna field goal, touchdowns were scored on a 28-yard Meger pass to Marcus Goodwin and on a four-yard Parker run. The Hurons scored again late in the game on an 11-yard Shane Jackson touchdown pass to Chris Nyenhuis to make the final score 37–23. The victory improved Toledo's all-time record against Eastern Michigan to 11–7.

Bowling Green

Source:

Before what was the second largest crowd to witness a game at the Glass Bowl, Toledo defeated the Bowling Green Falcons 19–13 to win the Peace Pipe. After a Rusty Hanna field goal gave the Rockets an early 3–0 lead, a pair of Erik White touchdown passes gave the Falcons a 13–3 halftime lead. However, the Toledo defense shutout the Bowling Green offense in the second half, and the Rockets came back to win 19–13. Points were scored in the third on a seven-yard touchdown run by Kevin Meger and a one-yard Troy Parker touchdown run. Hanna added a field goal in the fourth. The victory improved Toledo's all-time record against Bowling Green to 22–29–4.

Central Michigan

Source:

In the hype that led to their game against the Central Michigan Chippewas, the press billed the contest as the de facto MAC championship game. At Mount Pleasant, the Rockets failed to score a touchdown and suffered their first loss of the season in a 13–12 loss. The Rockets scored first on a 28-yard Rusty Hanna field goal, but the Chippewas responded with a 53-yard Jeff Bender touchdown pass to Ken Ealy to take a 7–3 lead at the end of the first quarter. A 46-yard Hanna field goal in the second cut the Central lead to 7–6 at halftime.

In the third quarter, Toledo briefly retook the lead after Hanna connected on field goals of 41 and 26 yards. However, the Chippewas scored the game-winning touchdown later in the quarter when Bender threw a 38-yard touchdown pass to Bob Kench for the 13–12 victory. For his six-tackle performance, Mark Rhea was named the Mid-American Conference Defensive Player of the Week. The loss brought Toledo's all-time record against Central Michigan to 7–10–2.

Kent State

Source:

Against head coach Nick Saban's alma mater, the Rockets defeated the Kent State Golden Flashes 28–14, one week after their first loss of the season. Toledo scored first on a one-yard Troy Parker touchdown run for a 7–0 lead. The Flashes responded with a 14-yard Joe Dalpra touchdown pass to tie the game at 7–7 at the end of the first. After the Rockets regained the lead on a 35-yard Rusty Hanna field goal, Kent took a 14–10 halftime lead on a six-yard Dalpra touchdown run.

A second, 35-yard field goal cut the Kent State lead to 14–13, and a pair of fourth-quarter touchdowns sealed the victory for Toledo. Touchdowns were scored by Neil Trotter on a 38-yard run and on a three-yard pass from Kevin Meger to Dan Grossman for the 28–14 win. The victory improved Toledo's all-time record against Kent State to 18–19.

Western Michigan

Source:

In their final conference game of the season, Toledo defeated the Western Michigan Broncos 37–9 to secure the conference co-championship with Central Michigan. Toledo led 7–6 at halftime after Kevin Meger threw a 33-yard touchdown pass to Rickey Isaiah for the Rockets, and Dan Boggan scored for the Broncos on a one-yard touchdown run.

Toledo then scored three third-quarter touchdowns to take a 28–6 lead. Touchdowns were scored on a three-yard Meger pass to Jerry Evans, a 14-yard Meger run, and on a 67-yard Meger pass to Romauldo Brown. The Broncos then scored their final points of the game on a 31-yard Jay Barresi field goal to make the score 28–9 at the start of the fourth quarter. In the fourth, Damon Nelson scored on a one-yard touchdown run and Western snapped a punt out of the end zone for a safety and a 37–9 Toledo win. The victory improved Toledo's all-time record against Western Michigan to 23–22.

Navy

Source:

In what was the Rockets' first all-time meeting against Navy, 14 unanswered points in the fourth quarter gave the Midshipmen the 14–10 win at the Glass Bowl. Toledo led 10–0 as they entered the fourth quarter with points scored on a 34-yard Hanna field goal in the first and on a six-yard David Andrews touchdown run in the third. Navy came back to win the game in the fourth on a pair of Jason Pace touchdowns. The first came on a nine-yard run and the second on a five-yard reception from Alton Grizzard. The loss effectively resulted in the Rockets failing to get a bowl bid as Central Michigan got the automatic MAC bid to the California Bowl due to having the tiebreaker over Toledo.

Arkansas State

Source:

In the final game of the season, Toledo defeated the Arkansas State Indians 43–28 at the Glass Bowl. The Indians scored first on a 24-yard Troy Mabone touchdown run followed by a one-yard Neil Trotter touchdown run for a 7–7 tie at the end of the first. In the second quarter Trotter scored on a two-yard run and Mabone on a one-yard run before a 38-yard Kevin Meger touchdown pass to Rickey Isaiah and 33-yard Rusty Hanna field goal gave the Rockets a 24–14 halftime lead.

In the third, Aubrey Miller recovered a Toledo fumble in the endzone for a touchdown and cut the Rockets lead to 24–21. Each team then traded touchdowns with Toledo scoring on a 27-yard Pat Johnson run and Arkansas State on a one-yard Roy Johnson run to make the score 31–28 at the start of the fourth. In the fourth, Toledo scored 12 unanswered points for the win. Damon Nelson scored on a four-yard touchdown run and Hanna connected on field goals of 33 and 41 yards in the 43–28 win. The nine wins were the most won by a Toledo squad since the 1983 season.

Saban resignation
Nick Saban resigned as Toledo's head coach on February 13, 1991, after one season to become defensive coordinator of the National Football League's Cleveland Browns under Bill Belichick. As defensive coordinator for the New York Giants, Belichick had to postpone assembling his new coaching staff until after Super Bowl XXV. Therefore, Saban's resignation wasn't announced until well after the season had ended. Additionally, Saban wanted any potential move to occur after February 6, National Signing Day for recruits.

References

Toledo
Toledo Rockets football seasons
Mid-American Conference football champion seasons
Toledo Rockets football